Don Jamieson may refer to:

 Don Jamieson (politician) (1921–1986), Canadian politician, diplomat and broadcaster
 Don Jamieson (comedian) (born 1966), American stand-up comedian and television host